Acathexis is a psychoanalytic term for a lack of emotional response to significant memories or actual interactions, where such a response would normally be expected.

The term also refers more broadly to a general absence of normal or expected feelings.

Acathexis has been linked to anxiety, bipolar disorder and dementia, while the phenomenon also appears in posttraumatic stress disorder.

See also

References

Further reading
 P. Sifeos, 'Affect. Emotional Conflicts, and Deficits' Psychotherapy-and-Psychosomatics 56 (1991) 116-22

Psychoanalytic terminology
Freudian psychology